The WTA International Tournaments was a category for professional tennis tournaments of the Women's Tennis Association from the 2009 WTA Tour until 2020, which replaced the previous Tier III and Tier IV categories. The winner of a WTA International adds 280 points to her WTA ranking.  As of 2021 these events have been reclassified as WTA 250 tournaments.

For the 2020 season, there were 32 tournaments, all knock-out tournaments with a prize money for every event at $275,000 ($775,000 for Shenzhen, and $525,000 for Guangzhou and Hong Kong).

Events

Internationals

Defunct

Winners by tournament

Singles

Current tournaments

Previous tournaments

See also 
 WTA Premier tournaments
 WTA 250 tournaments